The 2014 Monterrey Open was a women's tennis tournament played on outdoor hard courts. It was the 6th edition of the Monterrey Open and an International tournament on the 2014 WTA Tour. It took place at the Club Sonoma in Monterrey, Mexico, from 31 March to 6 April.

Points and prize money

Point distribution

Prize money

Singles main draw entrants

Seeds 

 Rankings as of 17 March 2014

Other entrants 
The following players received wildcards into the main draw:
  Kirsten Flipkens
  Ximena Hermoso
  Marcela Zacarías

The following players received entry via qualifying:
  Julia Boserup
  Dalila Jakupović
  Luksika Kumkhum
  Aleksandra Wozniak

Withdrawals 
Before the tournament
  Victoria Azarenka (finger injury) → replaced by  Johanna Konta
  Nadiia Kichenok → replaced by  Jovana Jakšić
  Mandy Minella (edema in right arm) → replaced by  Tadeja Majerič
  Laura Robson → replaced by  Olga Puchkova

Retirements
  Ayumi Morita (dizziness)

Doubles main draw entrants

Seeds 

 Rankings as of 17 March 2014

Other entrants 
The following pairs received wildcards into the doubles main draw:
  Alejandra Cisneros /  Camila Fuentes
  Victoria Rodríguez /  Marcela Zacarías

Withdrawals
During the tournament
  Kimiko Date-Krumm (right leg injury)

Champions

Singles 

   Ana Ivanovic def.  Jovana Jakšić 6–2, 6–1

Doubles 

  Darija Jurak /  Megan Moulton-Levy def.  Tímea Babos /  Olga Govortsova 7–6(7–5), 3–6, [11–9]

References

External links 
 

2014 WTA Tour
2014
2014 in Mexican tennis
March 2014 sports events in Mexico
April 2014 sports events in Mexico